Trinity Lemyra Thomas (born April 7, 2001) is an American artistic gymnast and a four-time National Team member (2016–20). She was a member of the gold-medal winning team at the 2018 Pan American Gymnastics Championships, where she also won silver medals in the individual all-around and on the uneven bars, as well as the bronze medalist on balance beam and floor exercise at the 2017 national championships. She is also currently a member of the Florida Gators women's gymnastics team.

Gymnastics career

Pre-Elite

2011–2012 
Thomas commenced gymnastics training in 2008, at the age of 7 – a relatively late start for an elite-level gymnast. In 2011, training at Skyline Gymnastics in York, she was the Pennsylvania state champion for Level 7 in the all-around and on all four pieces. As a result, she skipped Level 8 to compete as a Level 9 gymnast, placing second at the 2012 Regionals. At the 2012 Level 9 Eastern Championship in Maryland, she was fourth in the all-around; she competed against future teammate Sydney Johnson-Scharpf.

2013-2014 
For the 2013 season, Thomas moved to Artistic Sports Academy Plus (ASAP) in Harrisburg, Pennsylvania, and moved up to Level 10; the highest level of the USAG program. She was third at States, ninth at Regionals and, as a result, qualified to the J.O. NIT competition. At the competition, held in Minneapolis, Minnesota, Thomas finished fourth in the all-around and was the National Champion on floor.

In 2014, following her move to Prestige Gymnastics in Lancaster, she only competed three events at the Pennsylvania State Championships.

Junior Elite

2015
In February 2015, Thomas qualified as a Junior International Elite gymnast through her performance in the WOGA Classic Elite Qualifier.

Senior Elite

2017
Thomas turned senior in 2017.  She made her senior international debut at the 2017 City of Jesolo Trophy where she helped the USA finish first.  In July Thomas competed at the 2017 U.S. Classic.  She only competed on uneven bars and balance where she placed third on each.  Later in the summer Thomas competed at the 2017 U.S. National Gymnastics Championships where she placed fourth in the all-around behind Ragan Smith, Jordan Chiles, and Riley McCusker, sixth on bars, and third on beam and floor. As a result, she was named to the senior national team and invited to participate in the Worlds Team Selection Camp. After the two days of trials, Chiles and Thomas were selected as the non-traveling alternates for the 2017 Artistic Gymnastics World Championships.

2018
In the beginning of the year Thomas was selected to compete at the Tokyo World Cup, where she won silver behind Mai Murakami of Japan.  In April she announced her commitment to the University of Florida and their gymnastics team.  In August Thomas competed at the 2018 U.S. National Gymnastics Championships where she placed eighth in the all-around, fourth on bars, and sixth on beam and floor, and was once again named to the senior national team.  On August 20, 2018 Thomas was named to the team to compete at the Pan American Championships alongside Grace McCallum, Jade Carey, Kara Eaker, and Shilese Jones. There she won gold in the team final and silver in the all-around and on uneven bars.  Thomas was invited to attend the Worlds Team Selection Camp but declined.

NCAA and Elite

2019
In 2019 Thomas became one of the few gymnasts to train both NCAA and elite gymnastics simultaneously.

Thomas began competing as a collegiate gymnast for the Florida Gators in the 2018–2019 season.  At the 2019 SEC Championships Thomas placed first on vault, second of floor exercise behind Sarah Finnegan of Louisiana State third in the all-around behind Finnegan and Lexi Graber of Alabama.  She helped Florida place second overall.  During the Regional Finals, the Florida Gators lost, being upset by the Denver Pioneers and the Oregon State Beavers, and thus did not qualify as a team to compete at the 2019 NCAA Championships.  Thomas, however, qualified as an individual on floor exercise and uneven bars.  At the 2019 NCAA Championships Thomas placed seventh on floor exercise and 30th on uneven bars.

Thomas returned to elite competition and competed at the 2019 GK US Classic in July, opting to only compete on uneven bars and balance beam. On the two events, she placed sixth and seventh, respectively.

At U.S. National Championships Thomas competed in the all-around, where she finished in ninth place. She also placed fourth on uneven bars behind Sunisa Lee, Morgan Hurd, and Simone Biles, tenth on balance beam, and fifteenth on floor exercise. As a result she was added to the national team for the fourth time.

2020
On January 24, in a meet against Louisiana State, while performing on the uneven bars Thomas earned her first collegiate perfect 10.0.  The following week she earned her second perfect 10, this time on balance beam, in a meet against Denver and Iowa State.  On March 7, in a meet against Penn State, Thomas earned a perfect 10 on floor exercise; she was the second of two gymnasts that season to be awarded the perfect score, the first was Gracie Kramer. Due to the COVID-19 pandemic in the United States, the NCAA cancelled the remainder of the 2020 season on March 12.  Thomas was nominated for the Honda Sports Award alongside Kyla Ross (who won the award), Maggie Nichols, and Lexy Ramler.

2021
Thomas announced her retirement from elite gymnastics in May, citing that her ankle injuries earlier in the year has hindered her training for the 2020 Olympic Games and that she would instead focus on rehabbing her injury and continuing to compete at the NCAA level.

2022 
On January 16, in a meet against Alabama, Thomas earned a perfect 10 on both vault and floor exercise.  By earning a 10 on vault, Thomas became the 12th NCAA gymnast and third Florida Gator after Bridget Sloan and Alex McMurtry to earn a gym slam (a perfect 10 on all four apparatuses). She is also the only NCAA gymnast to earn a perfect 10 on each apparatus at least 3 times.

2023 

During the season opener quad meet versus West Virginia, Ball State, and Lindenwood on January 6th, Thomas earned a perfect 10 on the balance beam, joining Bridget Sloan as the only Gators to open a season with a perfect mark.  On January 27 Thomas scored a perfect ten on vault in a meet against Georgia.  In doing so she earned her fourth career gym slam.

Personal life 
Thomas was born on April 7, 2001 in York, Pennsylvania to parents Titania and Tisen Thomas. Her father, Tisen, was a wide receiver for Penn State University's Nittany Lions football team – a 1993 graduate. She has four siblings; Tesia, a former gymnast, volleyball player and  swimmer now competing in track and field at Penn State, University Park Taleyn, a gymnast, diver and pole vaulter  Tristen, a gymnast and swimmer and Tayvon, an offensive and defensive football player and swimmer.

Competitive history

Career perfect 10.0

NCAA Regular season ranking

References

External links 
 

2001 births
Living people
African-American female gymnasts
American female artistic gymnasts
Florida Gators women's gymnasts
Sportspeople from York, Pennsylvania
U.S. women's national team gymnasts
NCAA gymnasts who have scored a perfect 10
21st-century African-American sportspeople
21st-century African-American women